Child Exploitation Tracking System (CETS) is a Microsoft software based solution that assists in managing and linking worldwide cases related to child protection. CETS was developed in collaboration with law enforcement in Canada. Administered by the loose partnership of Microsoft and law enforcement agencies, CETS offers tools to gather and share evidence and information so they can identify, prevent and punish those who commit crimes against children.

About the CETS partnership
In 2003, Detective Sergeant Paul Gillespie, Officer in Charge of the Child Exploitation Section of the Toronto Police Service's Sex Crimes Unit, made a request directly to Bill Gates, CEO and Chief Architect at Microsoft at the time, for assistance with these types of crimes. Agencies experienced in tracking and apprehending those who perpetrate such crimes were involved in the design, implementation, and policy. The solution needed to assist law enforcement agencies from the initial point of detection, through the investigative phase, to arrest, prosecution, and conviction of the criminal. In addition, it was imperative that the solution adhered to existing rights and civil liberties of the citizens of the various countries. This included remaining independent of Internet traffic and any individual user’s computer. Finally, such a solution needed to be global in nature and enable collaboration among nations and agencies. 

In order to increase the effectiveness of investigators worldwide, such a system would allow law enforcement entities to:
 Collect evidence of online child exploitation gathered by multiple law enforcement agencies.
 Organize and store the information safely and securely.
 Search the database of information.
 Securely share the information with other agencies, across jurisdictions.
 Analyze the information and provide pertinent matches.
 Adhere to global software industry standards.

Law enforcement partnerships worldwide
A number of law enforcement agencies use or are deploying the CETS tool, these include:
Australia:  High Tech Crime Centre
Brazil: Federal Police
Canada: Royal Canadian Mounted Police, Toronto Police Services Sex Crime Unit, & Twenty-six other Canadian police services
Chile: National Investigative Police
Indonesia: National Police
Italy: Ministry of Interior and Postal police
Romania: National Police
Spain: Interior Ministry
United Kingdom: Child Exploitation and Online Protection Command of the National Crime Agency. 
United States: Department of Homeland Security and Federal Bureau of Investigation
 In Planning :  Poland, Argentina and United Arab Emirates 

Child exploitation crimes have been an increasing problem as technology advances. The tracking system has a proven success rate bringing many of those who violate the law to justice. Microsoft contributed technology in creating NCMEC which furthered the development of a system which captures criminals in addition to removing offensive images. "Microsoft has implemented PhotoDNA on its own online properties including Bing, OneDrive (previously known as SkyDrive) and Hotmail, which has already resulted in the identification, reporting and removal of thousands of images of child pornography" (Microsoft, 2013). Microsoft. "Child Exploitation Crimes." Microsoft. N.p., 2013. Web. Microsoft has been a large contributor toward the efforts of online surveillance which has broken down the walls of online anonymity.

See also
 Microsoft litigation
 National Cyber Security Awareness Month

Notes and references

External links
 The International Centre for Missing & Exploited Children
 Kids' Internet Safety Alliance (KINSA)
 Child Exploitation Tracking System - Australian Criminal Intelligence Commission 

Child abuse
Computer security software
Child sexual abuse